The Archipelago of San Andrés, Providencia and Santa Catalina, or San Andrés and Providencia, is one of the departments of Colombia, and the only one located geographically in Central America. The largest island of the archipelago and Colombia is called San Andrés and its capital is San Andrés. The other large islands are Providencia and Santa Catalina Islands which lie to the north-east of San Andrés; their capital is Santa Isabel.

Name
The name is sometimes abbreviated to "Archip. de San Andres".  The official website abbreviates it as San Andrés ("Gobernación de San Andrés"). ISO 3166-2:CO lists it as "San Andrés, Providencia y Santa Catalina".  Statoids lists it as "San Andrés y Providencia".

History
Spain formally claimed the archipelago of San Andres and Providencia in 1510, a few years after the voyages of Christopher Columbus. In 1544, the territory was placed under the administration of the Captaincy General of Guatemala. During the early years, Spain concentrated on exploring and colonizing the mainland and hardly settled the islands.

In 1630, English Puritans arrived in Providence Island, under the aegis of the Providence Island Company. The Puritans decided to settle the tropical islands, rather than cold, rocky New England, but the Providence Island colony did not succeed in the same way as the Massachusetts Bay Colony. They established slave-worked plantations and engaged in privateering, which led to the Spanish and Portuguese conquering the colony in May, 1641. In 1670, English buccaneers, led by Henry Morgan, took over the islands, which he used as a base to attack Panama. The buccaneers abandoned the islands by 1672. There is no record of anyone inhabiting the islands from then for another century.

In 1775, Lieutenant Tomás O'Neil, a Spaniard of Irish descent, was given military command of the islands and, in 1790, was named governor. He requested the transfer of the islands to the jurisdiction of the Viceroyalty of New Granada, which was granted in 1803. That year, Spain assigned the islands, together with the province of Veraguas (western Panama and the east coast of Nicaragua), to the Viceroyalty of New Granada. The territory was administered from the province of Cartagena. Soon, trade links with Cartagena were greater than those with Guatemala.

On 4 July 1818, a French corsair, Louis-Michel Aury, with 400 men and 14 ships flying the Argentine flag, captured Old Providence and St. Catherine islands. The island was populated by white English-speaking Protestants and their slaves. Aury and his team used the islands as their new base from which to pursue Central American independence. However, his efforts to also support Bolivar in his fight for Venezuelan and Colombian independence were repeatedly turned down.

After the Spanish colonies became independent, the inhabitants of San Andrés, Providence and St. Catherine voluntarily adhered to the Republic of Gran Colombia in 1822, which placed them under the administration of the Magdalena Department. The First Mexican Empire, which was succeeded by the United Provinces of Central America (UPCA), also claimed the islands. Gran Colombia, in turn, protested the UPCA's occupation of the eastern coast of Nicaragua. The UPCA broke up in 1838 to 1840, but Nicaragua carried on the dispute, as did Gran Colombia's successors: New Granada and Colombia. A local administration (intendencia) was established in the islands in 1912 by Colombia.

In 1928, Colombia and Nicaragua signed the Esguerra-Bárcenas Treaty, which gave control of the islands to Colombia. However, when the Sandinista government assumed power in the 1980s, Nicaragua repudiated the treaty. Colombia argues that the treaty's final ratification in 1930 (when the US forces were already on their way out) confirms its validity. Colombia and Honduras signed a maritime boundary treaty in 1999, which implicitly accepts Colombian sovereignty over the islands.

In 2001, Nicaragua filed claims with the International Court of Justice (ICJ) over the disputed maritime boundary and claimed  in the Caribbean, including the San Andrés and Providencia Archipelagoes. Colombia responded that the court has no jurisdiction over the matter and increased its naval and police presence in the islands. Colombia also defended its claim in the ICJ. On 13 December 2007, the ICJ ruled that the islands were Colombian territory but left the maritime border dispute unresolved. On 19 November 2012, the ICJ held that Colombia had sovereignty over the islands.

United States claims 
In the 19th century, the United States claimed several uninhabited locations in the area under the Guano Island Act, including several now claimed by Colombia. In 1981, the US ceded its claims to Serrana Bank and Roncador Bank to Colombia and abandoned its claim to Quita Sueño Bank. The US still maintains claims over Serranilla Bank and Bajo Nuevo Bank and considers them both to be unincorporated territories of the United States.

Declaration of self-determination 

In 1903, the local Raizal population rejected an offer from the US to separate from Colombia in the wake of Panama's secession from Colombia. However, the island's native population soon changed its mind when the policies of successive Colombian governments tried consistently to modify the majority Raizal and British ethnic composition of the Islands by the extensive migration of Spanish-speaking mainland Colombians. The efforts at assimilation and immigration were led largely by Catholic missionaries, which angered the Protestant native population.

Local government and representation

2007 elections 
A member of the departmental assembly for 15 years, Pedro Gallardo Forbes, of the Regional Integration Movement (MIR), won the 28 October 2007 gubernatorial election, with support from the Colombian Conservative Party and the Radical Change party. He succeeded a governor from the Colombian Liberal Party. He got 8,187 votes (38.93%), Aury Guerrero Bowie (Liberal Party, with support from the Democratic Colombia Party) 8,160 votes (38.8%), and Jack Housni Jaller (Social National Unity Party) 4,063 votes (19.3%). Only 21,991 out of 41,197 potential electors voted in the gubernatorial election.

At the departmental assembly, elected the same day, the 9 seats were distributed among 6 parties: three Liberals (Arlington Howard, Qwincy Bowie Gordon, and Leroy Carol Bent Archbold), two MIR (Jorge Méndez and Freddy Herazo) two Democratic Colombia Party (former MP María Teresa Uribe Bent and former Interior Secretary Rafael Gómez Redondo), two SNUP (Fernando Cañon Florez and María Said Darwich), one Radical Change (Heber Esquivel Benitez), and one Conservative (Julio César Gallardo Martínez).

The new mayor of Providence, Janeth Archbold (Team Colombia party), a political ally of the new governor, was elected with 1,013 votes against Liberal Mark Taylor (515 votes), SNUP Arturo Robinson (514 votes) and Conservative Peter Bent.

Geography 
Besides the San Andrés and Providencia island groups, there are eight atolls that belong to the department, including submerged Alice Shoal.

Island of San Andrés

San Andrés Island 

This is the main island of the San Andrés group, and the largest of the department. There is a tiny lagoon in the centre of the island called Big Pond. The principal town is San Andrés in the north of the island. Another town is San Luis on the east coast. Cayo Johnny (Johnny Caye) lies  ENE of German Point (Punta Norte), the island's northern tip, and Haynes Cay about the same distance east of the island.

Cayos de Albuquerque (Cayos de S.W., Southwest Cays) 
It is the westernmost point of Colombia. In the southern part are Cayo del Norte and Cayo del Sur. It is maintained by the Colombian Navy.

Cayos del Este Sudeste (Courtown Cays, Cayos de E.S.E.) 

There are a few sand cays in the southeast. All cays are overgrown with palm trees and bushes, and surrounded by mangroves. There is a Colombian Navy lighthouse on Cayo Bolivar. The cays are regularly visited by fishermen from the Colombian mainland and San Andrés. There are two concrete buildings on Cayo Bolivar, and a few wooden huts on the other cays.

Banks and shoals 
Colombia claims sovereignty over six additional outlying banks and shoals: Alice Shoal, Bajo Nuevo Bank, Serranilla Bank, Quita Sueño Bank, Serrana Bank, and Roncador Bank.

Demographics 

The latest official estimate for 2007 is 72,923.

Before 1960, the population of the islands was almost entirely Raizals, who are an Afro-Caribbean group, Protestant in religion, speaking San Andrés–Providencia Creole. There is a minority of white English-speaking Protestants of British descent. Colombia has promoted the migration of Spanish-speaking mainlanders, with Catholic missions participating since 1947. This policy seems to be an answer to growing discontent within the Raizal community that could strengthen separatist movements; a Raizal majority would in this case win a pro-independence referendum but this could be neutralized by outnumbering them with mainland Colombians.

By 2005, Raizals were only 30% of the 60,000 or more inhabitants of the islands, with the rest being mainland Colombians and English-speaking whites of British descent. Most Raizals are multilingual and can speak both Spanish and English.

Transportation

Airports
Gustavo Rojas Pinilla International Airport (IATA: ADZ) serves the towns of San Andrés and San Luis, but also commercially serves the nearby island of Providencia Island through feeder flights from El Embrujo Airport.
Gustavo Rojas Pinilla International Airport was initially called Sesquicentenario International Airport. It is the 6th busiest airport in Colombia, handling 836,234 passengers in 2006. Most of these passengers come from the continental part of the country, due to poor international direct service to the island. Many international tourists have to fly to one of Colombia's largest airports to be able to reach the islands. Copa Airlines maintains a passenger service between San Andrés and Panama City. In 2021, American Airlines began serving San Andrés nonstop from Miami. In recent years, San Andrés has also received seasonal charter flights, mainly from Canada and a few Central American countries.

The airport is one of Colombia's fastest growing airports with a 13.4% increase in the number of passengers between 2005 and 2006.

See also

List of Caribbean islands#San Andrés, Providencia and Santa Catalina

References

Sources

External links

 Official website: 
 Geotoutism http://www.caribbeancolombia.com/ San Andres, Providencia and Santa Catalina are a perfect spot to explore Geoutourism. Visit the website made with National Geographic where you can find an interactive mapguide the places to visit and much more
 
 ICJ Nicaragua v. Colombia (Preliminary Objections) and (Merits) and 2007 Preliminary Objections Judgment and ASIL and BBC and Colombia President and Colombia MFA and Analysis 20 Hague YIL 75-119 2008
 Tour Operator in the island, website with satellite map (Spanish)
 Tour Operator with Travel tips and must see in San Andrés in (en;es;de)
 Scuba diving information about San Andrés (Spanish)
 Information on some Atolls (German)
 Information on Colombian lighthouses (German)
 
 New York Times article on independence movement

 
Caribbean region of Colombia
Departments of Colombia
Caribbean islands of Colombia
Islands of the West Caribbean
Atolls of Colombia
Biosphere reserves of Colombia
English-speaking countries and territories
1630 establishments in the British Empire
1630 establishments in South America
States and territories established in 1991
1991 establishments in Colombia
Former English colonies
1991 establishments in North America